Cicindela splendida, the splendid tiger beetle, is a species of flashy tiger beetle in the family Carabidae. It lives in North America.

References

Further reading

External links

 

splendida
Articles created by Qbugbot
Beetles described in 1830